Here Comes the Bride is a 2007 Philippine television reality television series broadcast by Q. Hosted by Christine Jacob, it premiered on March 22, 2007. The show concluded on June 28, 2007.

Accolades

2007 Philippine television series debuts
2007 Philippine television series endings
Filipino-language television shows
Philippine reality television series
Q (TV network) original programming